Maja Dahlqvist (born 15 April 1994) is a Swedish cross-country skier who represents the club Falun-Borlänge SK. She won the Sprint World Cup in 2022, as well as two silver medals and a bronze at the 2022 Winter Olympics.

Cross-country skiing results
All results are sourced from the International Ski Federation (FIS).

Olympic Games
 3 medals – (2 silver, 1 bronze)

World Championships
 4 medals – (2 gold, 2 bronze)

World Cup

Season titles
 1 title – (1 sprint)

Season standings

Individual podiums
 5 victories – (5 ) 
 24 podiums – (20 , 4 )

Team podiums
 7 victories – (7 ) 
 10 podiums – (2 , 8 )

References

External links

 

Living people
1994 births
People from Falun
Swedish female cross-country skiers
Tour de Ski skiers
FIS Nordic World Ski Championships medalists in cross-country skiing
Olympic cross-country skiers of Sweden
Cross-country skiers at the 2022 Winter Olympics
Medalists at the 2022 Winter Olympics
Olympic medalists in cross-country skiing
Olympic silver medalists for Sweden
Olympic bronze medalists for Sweden
21st-century Swedish women